Jonathan Little (born December 22, 1984 in Pensacola, Florida) is an American professional poker player who won both the World Poker Tour's Season VI Mirage Poker Showdown and Season VII Foxwoods World Poker Finals and won the WPT Season VI Player of the Year award.

Biography 

Little was a student at the University of West Florida studying psychology when he began playing poker with friends. As his interest in poker grew, it led him to study many books on poker. After earning an initial bankroll of $350,000 online over a six-month period, he decided to drop out of college and play poker professionally.

Poker 
Little is a successful professional poker player who has played online under the screen names "FieryJustice", "Jcardshark", and "JonLittle".

Little posts a weekly educational poker blog and hosts a weekly podcast at his personal site, JonathanLittlePoker.com.

Little was a participant in the now defunct online poker training site called SNGIcons.com.  Little has since created his own poker training websites, PokerCoaching.com and FloatTheTurn.com

Little creates poker training hand-packs™ for Insta Poker, a mobile-only poker strategy game on iPhone, iPod and iPad.

World Championship of Online Poker
At the 2008 World Championship of Online Poker, playing under his PokerStars screen name "Jcardshark", Little finished 7th place in the $10,300 buy-in (event #5), earning $107,535 at a final table consisting of other well known players like Major League Baseball Pitcher Orel Hershiser (O. Hershiser), 2003 World Series of Poker Main Event Champion Chris Moneymaker (Money800) online pros Nick Niergarth (gbmantis), Greg Hobson (DuckU), Scott Dorin (dorinvandy) who won the event and the European Poker Tour Season IV Grand Final Champion Glen Chorny (Choron). This win brings Little's total online cashes on Pokerstars to over $280,000.

Full Tilt 
In March 2008, Full Tilt Poker announced it had dropped Little from its group of sponsored professionals for violating its terms and conditions by allowing other people to play his Full Tilt account. Via his blog, Little later accepted responsibility for his actions and issued an apology to Full Tilt.

World Poker Tour 
Little finished fifth in the World Poker Tour (WPT) PokerStars.com Caribbean Poker Adventure Championship winning $317,000 and went to win the WPT Mirage Poker Showdown title, earning $1,091,295. The final table was made of four other professional poker players, Cory Carroll who finished runner-up, Darrell Dicken (3rd), Phil Ivey (5th), and Amnon Filippi (6th). In November 2007 he finished runner-up to Scott Clements in the WPT North American Poker Championship, where he earned an additional $715,702.
Jonathan Little is the WPT Season VI Player of the Year.

In November 2008, Little won the WPT Foxwoods World Poker Finals for his second WPT title after defeating professional poker player Jonathan Jaffe during heads-up play. The final table included professional poker players Mike Matusow who finished 6th and David Pham who finished 4th. The match broke the record for longest WPT final table at 275 hands and longest WPT heads-up match with 170 hands.

World Series of Poker 
Little has cashed 30 times at the World Series of Poker (WSOP).  In 2010, he cashed 5 times, including a 3rd-place finish in Event # 53, the Limit Hold'em Shootout for $73,218.  In 2013, he cashed 5 times, including a 3rd-place finish in Event # 32, the No-Limit Hold 'Em/Six Handed $5,000 buy-in for $238,833, as well as twice at the WSOPE. In 2015, he cashed 4 times, including a 6th-place finish in Event # 25, Eight-Handed $5,000 buy-in for $85,616. 
In 2016 he cashed in 5 events for $63,231 - including a tag team event with his mother and father as partners.

His lifetime winnings at the WSOP total $696,841.

As of February 2019, his total live tournament winnings exceed $6,800,000.

Personal life 
Little married on August 1, 2015 to Amie Broder. His best man was fellow poker player, Shannon Shorr. When Little is not traveling the live poker circuit, he teaches his students how to improve their poker strategies at PokerCoaching.com.

Bibliography 
 Secrets of Professional Tournament Poker, Volume 1: Fundamentals and How to Handle Varying Stack Sizes (2011) 
 Secrets of Professional Tournament Poker, Volume 2: Stages of the Tournament (2012) 
 Secrets of Professional Tournament Poker, Volume 3: The Complete Workout (2013) 
 Positive Poker: A Modern Psychological Approach to Mastering Your Mental Game (2013) 
 The Main Event with Jonathan Little: In-Depth Analysis of 54 Poker Hands from my WSOP Main Event (2014) 
 Jonathan Little on Live No-Limit Cash Games, Volume 1: The Theory  (2014) 
 Jonathan Little on Live No-Limit Cash Games, Volume 2: The Practice  (2015) 
 Strategies for Beating Small Stakes Poker Tournaments (2015) 
 Jonathan Little's Excelling at No-Limit Hold'em: Leading poker experts discuss how to study, play and master NLHE  (2015) 
 Strategies for Beating Small Stakes Poker Cash Games  (2015) 
 Peak Poker Performance: How to bring your 'A' game to every session (2016) 
 Bluffs: How to Intelligently Apply Aggression to Increase Your Profits from Poker (2016)

References

External links 
 Official Website
 PokerCoaching.com
 FloatTheTurn.com
 JonathanLittleSecrets.com
 Insta Poker
 Pokerlistings.com interview
 CardPlayer.com – 2007 a Big Year for Little
 Jonathan Little Interview (audio + transcript)
 Jonathan Little Interview - Poker Journey and Live Games Tips

American poker players
World Poker Tour winners
1984 births
Living people
Sportspeople from Pensacola, Florida